Aguriahana stellulata is a species of true bug belonging to the family Cicadellidae.

It is native to Europe and Northern America.

References

Cicadellidae